Cîietu is a commune in Cantemir District, Moldova. It is composed of two villages, Cîietu and Dimitrova.

References

Communes of Cantemir District